Ciudad de Marbella Trophy is a summer tournament organized by Atlético Marbella in Marbella. In the beginning there used to be three participating teams, but in the last years it has been a two-team tournament. The first edition was in 1963 and was won by the home team. From 1963 to 1978 the tournament was called the Trofeo Semana del Sol (Sun Week Trophy) of 1979–1992 was called Ciudad de Marbella Trophy, in 1993 and 1994 changed the name FORTA Trophy, Antena 3 Marbella Trophy called in 1995, turning to call Ciudad de Marbella Trophy in the last edition of 1997.

Titles
Note that only the winner and runner-up is shown here. Some years there were more than two participating teams.

Notes and references

Marbella, Ciudad